Imre Varadi (born 8 July 1959) is an English former professional footballer, known as a journeyman forward who appeared for 16 different clubs at all levels of professional football in England.

Playing career
Varadi was born in Paddington, London, to a Hungarian father and Italian mother. He started out in non-League football with Letchworth before joining Sheffield United in 1978, shortly before his nineteenth birthday.

Varadi went on to become a nomadic journeyman, who rarely spent more than two years with any club and never made 100 league appearances in the colours of any team he played for.

From Sheffield United, he moved on to Everton, Newcastle United, Sheffield Wednesday, West Bromwich Albion, Manchester City, Swansea Town, Sheffield Wednesday again, Leeds United, Luton Town, Oxford United, Rotherham United, Mansfield Town, Boston United, Scunthorpe United and finally had a spell as player-manager at Matlock Town.

He was part of the Leeds United side that won the old First Division in 1992 but only played in three matches which was not enough games to earn a winner's medal. He was also part of the Sheffield Wednesday side that won promotion to the First Division in 1984, after 14 years away. He was sold to West Bromwich Albion a year later and was their top scorer with nine league goals in 1985–86, but was unable to prevent them from being relegated in bottom place with just 4 wins in the league. He was then sold to Manchester City, and was unable to prevent their relegation the following season, although he did help them reach the quarter-finals of the FA Cup in his second campaign there. He was nicknamed "Imre Banana" by the City fans, following the inflatable banana craze which the club's fans helped start that season.

He left Maine Road to sign for Sheffield Wednesday for a second time in the summer of 1988, and spent two seasons there, before they were relegated to the Second Division and he was sold to Leeds United in February 1990. He spent three seasons at Elland Road, but rarely played after his 1989–90 first season there, and did not make enough appearances in 1991–92 to earn a league title medal. He had loan spells at Luton Town and Oxford United before dropping down two divisions to sign for Rotherham United in the summer of 1993.

He spent two seasons at Millmoor, scoring 25 Division Two goals, before brief spells at Mansfield Town and Scunthorpe United. He called time on his professional career in 1995 when he became player-manager of non-league Matlock Town, before joining Guiseley.

In the spring of 1997, Varadi signed with the South Jersey Barons of the USISL D-3 Pro League in the United States. He only played in two league games before returning home to England with his manager Matt Driver citing "personal reasons." He scored his lone goal of his brief stint with the Barons against the New Hampshire Phantoms on 3 May 1997 in the club's first-ever home game at Carey Stadium in Ocean City, New Jersey.

He broke his retirement for one game for Stalybridge Celtic in 1998.

Post-retirement

He became a fully licensed FIFA Agent in March 2004 and provides commentary on games for both PA Sport (for the Football Live project) and BBC Radio Sheffield.

References

External links

Living people
1959 births
Footballers from Paddington
English footballers
Association football forwards
Letchworth F.C. players
Sheffield United F.C. players
Everton F.C. players
Newcastle United F.C. players
Sheffield Wednesday F.C. players
West Bromwich Albion F.C. players
Manchester City F.C. players
Leeds United F.C. players
Luton Town F.C. players
Oxford United F.C. players
Rotherham United F.C. players
Mansfield Town F.C. players
Scunthorpe United F.C. players
Boston United F.C. players
Matlock Town F.C. players
Guiseley A.F.C. players
Stalybridge Celtic F.C. players
English Football League players
Premier League players
English football managers
Matlock Town F.C. managers
English people of Hungarian descent
English people of Italian descent